Pineapple juice is a liquid made from pressing the natural liquid from the pulp of the pineapple (a fruit from a tropical plant). Numerous pineapple varieties may be used to manufacture commercial pineapple juice, the most common of which are Smooth Cayenne, Red Spanish, Queen, and Abacaxi. In manufacturing, pineapple juice is typically canned.

It is used as a single or mixed juice beverage, and for smoothies, cocktails, culinary flavor, and as a meat tenderizer. Pineapple juice is a main ingredient in the piña colada and the tepache.

History
There is no record of how or when pineapples arrived in Hawaii, with some accounts of pineapples being washed ashore from a Spanish or Portuguese shipwreck or brought ashore by sailors. The fruit may have arrived with the Spanish years before the arrival of Captain James Cook in 1778, but another source states the first pineapple was planted by Don Francisco de Paula Marin. While Marin was a horticulturalist who introduced many new plants to Hawaii, he may not have been the first person to introduce pineapples to Hawaii, but did describe pineapple planting in his journals in 1813.

Pineapple juice contributed to the success of the pineapple industry in the 1930s. In 1932, the Hawaiian Pineapple Company successfully developed a process of clarifying the juice, while capturing the aroma and flavor of the fruit. Large-scale cultivation of pineapples led to the formation of a pineapple commerce association which had strict production limits on the canning of whole, cut and crushed pineapple. Although industry members had agreed on these limitations in a 1934 pool agreement, the industry turned to canning of pineapple juice to expand commercial opportunities, while taking advantage of fruit juice as a new trend in breakfast drinks.

Production

Pineapple juice is manufactured from ripe pineapples. To clean pineapples before juicing, a brush and spray cleaning machine is used to remove stains, imperfections and pesticide residue. After cleaning, the fruit is put into a pineapple peeling and extractor machine to obtain pulps which are put into a spiral juice extractor. A juice fine filter is then used to remove all solids, fiber and colloidal particles from the pineapple juice. 

A vacuum degasser is used to remove the air in the pineapple juice. Removing the gas prevents the solids from floating. Degassing also helps to reduce foaming in packing and sterilization occurs in a heat exchanger. Pasteurizing pineapple juice stops the enzymes that cause browning. The pasteurized pineapple juice is put in iron drums lined with aseptic aluminum-plastic composite bags. After cooling, the pineapple juice is put into bottles or cans using a filling machine.

Pineapple juice powder is made by spraying pineapple juice on tapioca maltodextrin and leaving it to dry.

Nutrition

Pineapple juice is 84% water, 16% carbohydrates, and contains negligible fat and protein (table). In a 100 ml (g) reference amount, pineapple juice supplies 60 calories, with only manganese in significant content (53% of the Daily Value, DV), while vitamin C content is moderate (11% DV).

Cooking
Pineapple juice powder can be used in pies, cakes, muffins, scones, chutneys, jams, chilis, candies, sauces, and stews. Pineapple juice powder can be used to marinate chicken and fish.

Regulations
According to the U.S. Food and Drug Administration, manufactured and canned pineapple juice can have finely insoluble solids, although it cannot have coarse or hard substances or excessive pulp. It can be sweetened with a dry nutritive carbohydrate sweetener. In concentrated form, pineapple juice can be sweetened with a liquid.

Market

Countries consuming the most pineapple juice in 2017 were Thailand, Indonesia and the Philippines, having combined consumption of 47% of the world total. The consumption of pineapple juice in China and India is low compared to their populations. In 2019, the countries that consumed the most pineapple juice were Spain, France and Germany, consuming about half of the world total. Spain was the largest producer of pineapple juice in Europe, with France and Italy as secondary producers. According to the Center for the Promotion of Imports the leading consumers of pineapple juice in Europe from 2017-2021 were France, Germany, Spain, United Kingdom, Belgium and Italy. And the main importers of pineapple juice in Europe from 2017-2021 were the Netherlands, France, Germany, Spain, Belgium and United Kingdom.

Beverages
The tepache is made from the skin and core of pineapples, sugar cane and cinnamon. Developed in Puerto Rico as its national drink, the piña colada is a cocktail made with white rum, coconut cream, and pineapple juice. Developed in Singapore, the Singapore sling is a cocktail made with Gin, Cherry brandy, Cointreau, Bénédictine, lemon juice, pineapple juice and bitters. The Staten Island Ferry is a cocktail made of Malibu rum and pineapple juice.

See also 

 Pineapple juice cocktail
 Juicing
 List of juices

References

Further reading

External links 
 
Dole's Pineapple Juice Hawai'i Digital Newspaper

Pineapple drinks
Fruit juice